Max Müller (born 16 May 1994) is a German professional footballer who plays as a defender for FC Astoria Walldorf.

Career
Müller spent his early career with SV Sandhausen and Austria Salzburg, before signing for English club Wycombe Wanderers in August 2016. He joined Morecambe on loan on 22 August 2017.

He was released by Wycombe at the end of the 2017–18 season.

Following his release from Wycombe, he returned to Germany and signed for FC Astoria Walldorf on 22 May 2018.

Career statistics

References

1994 births
Living people
German footballers
Association football defenders
Regionalliga players
2. Liga (Austria) players
English Football League players
SV Sandhausen players
SV Austria Salzburg players
Wycombe Wanderers F.C. players
Morecambe F.C. players
FC Astoria Walldorf players
German expatriate footballers
German expatriate sportspeople in Austria
Expatriate footballers in Austria
German expatriate sportspeople in England
Expatriate footballers in England
People from Speyer
Footballers from Rhineland-Palatinate